Rajaâ Cherkaoui El Moursli (born 12 May 1954) is a Moroccan Professor of nuclear physics, at the faculty of science within the Mohammad V University of Rabat.

She won the L'Oréal-UNESCO Awards for Women in Science for her work on the Higgs Boson.

Life
El Moursli was born in Salé in 1954. She obtained her first degree in mathematics at Lycée Descartes in Rabat. She had to argue the case then with her father to be a girl who would leave conservative Morocco to study further. She says that Neil Armstrong's achievements and a high school teacher inspired her. She then went to study in Grenoble in France where she obtained her doctorate in physics at the Laboratoire de Physique subatomique et cosmologie which was part of the Joseph Fourier University. In 1982 she returned to Rabat.
Then she leads a research team  for the ATLAS experiment at CERN.

In 2015 she was awarded the L'Oréal-UNESCO Awards for Women in Science for Africa and the Arab states. The award cited her contribution to the proof of the existence of the Higgs Boson. This particle is responsible for the creation of mass. El Moursli raised the level of Moroccan scientific research and healthcare. The latter was acknowledged because she set up the first master's degree in medical physics.
Dave Charlton, ATLAS spokesperson   congratulated her for her award and said "ATLAS congratulates Professor Rajaâ Cherkaoui El Moursli for this prestigious award, and the recognition of her part in the discovery of the Higgs boson"

References

1954 births
Living people
People from Salé
Moroccan physicists
Moroccan women physicists
People associated with CERN
Physics educators
L'Oréal-UNESCO Awards for Women in Science laureates
Moroccan women scientists
Fellows of the African Academy of Sciences